Dorcus nepalensis is a stag beetle species first described by Frederick William Hope in 1831.

References

Lucaninae
Beetles of Asia
Beetles described in 1831
Taxa named by Frederick William Hope